Clear Hearts Grey Flowers is the second and final studio album by Jack Off Jill, released on July 17, 2000 through 404 Music and Risk Records. It was produced by Chris Vrenna of Nine Inch Nails/Tweaker.

Due to the closure of Risk Records in January 2000 and the breakup of Jack Off Jill shortly after the album's release, Clear Hearts Grey Flowers received minimal promotion. However, the album's popularity grew through the internet and word of mouth and helped cement Jack Off Jill a cult following in the years following its release. Clear Hearts Grey Flowers was issued on vinyl for the first time by Sympathy For The Record Industry in 2006.

Release 
Clear Hearts Grey Flowers was intended for release on March 14, 2000. However, in December 1999, it became apparent that the band's label, the Los Angeles-based Risk Records (a subsidiary of Risk Music Group), was deeply in debt from investing too much money in unsuccessful alternative rock acts. After trying and failing to sell Jack Off Jill "for ludicrous amounts of money" to major record labels, Risk Records went bankrupt in January 2000, which resulted in all of the label's staff, including the band's A&R rep, being laid off. Subsequently, Jack Off Jill and Clear Hearts Grey Flowers were transferred over to 404 Music, another Risk Music Group label based in Atlanta.

On April 10, 2000, Jack Off Jill performed a showcase of the album at The Troubadour in Los Angeles, California, with Chris Vrenna filling in on drums. This performance turned out to be Jack Off Jill's final show before their breakup, with Jessicka stating that the band had no plans to tour in support of the album.

404 Music did little to promote Clear Hearts Grey Flowers, which was released on July 17, 2000. In August 2000, Jack Off Jill officially broke up, with Jessicka citing "the stress of years of bad decisions, our record company being very unstable, the deterioration of mine and my bass players partnership, and the fact that we just couldn’t and didn’t want to fake it."

Artwork
The cover of Clear Hearts, Grey Flowers is a painting by Mark Ryden with the same name. The blonde woman in the album's cover art was speculated to be either:
 a representation of guitarist  Helen Storer of the UK all-female band Fluffy, who joined Jack Off Jill onstage once for their farewell performance at The Troubadour in Los Angeles in April 2000. On Jack Off Jill's website it said Storer was the blonde; or
 Michelle Inhell, the band's original  guitarist, who temporarily rejoined Jack Off Jill and cowrote two songs on this album.
Singer Jessicka later revealed on her website that she had sketched the concept for Mark Ryden and that the third woman was actually supposed to be a combination of both Inhell and Storer, who were both blonde at the time of the recording.

Track listing 

Note
Tracks 15-65 are blank, 0:06 each.

Personnel
Credits are adapted from the album's liner notes. Jack Off Jill
 Jessicka  –  vocals
 Robin "Agent" Moulder  –  bass, piano
Clinton  Walsh  –  guitars
 Norm Block  –  drums
Production
 Chris Vrenna  –  production, engineering
 Rich Moulder  – engineering
 Bill Kennedy  – mixing
 James Murray  – mixing assistant
 Tom Baker  – masteringManagement
 Rhian Gittins  – management (for Big PD Entertainment, Inc.)
 A&R  – none
 Jeremy Mohr  –  legal representation (for Hansen, Jacobson, Teller, Hoberman, Newman, Warren, Hertz & Goldring, LLP)
 Ken Hertz  –  legal representation (for Hansen, Jacobson, Teller, Hoberman, Newman, Warren, Hertz & Goldring, LLP)

Artwork
 Mark Ryden  –  cover artwork
 Wendy Sherman   – packaging design
 James Kenefick  –  website design

References

Jack Off Jill albums
2000 albums
Albums produced by Chris Vrenna
Riot grrrl albums
Alternative rock albums by American artists
Gothic rock albums by American artists
Albums with cover art by Mark Ryden